Killeen–Temple–Fort Hood is a metropolitan statistical area in Central Texas that covers three counties: Bell, Coryell, and Lampasas. As of the 2020 census, the MSA had a population of 475,367.

Similar to how the Dallas–Fort Worth metropolitan area of North Texas is often called the Metroplex, locals sometimes refer to this area as the Centroplex.

Counties
Bell
Coryell
Lampasas

Communities

Places with more than 75,000 people
Killeen
Temple

Places with 20,000 to 75,000 people
Copperas Cove
Harker Heights
Belton
Fort Hood

Places with 1,000 to 20,000 people

Bartlett
Gatesville 
Holland
Kempner
Lampasas
Little River-Academy
Morgan's Point Resort
Nolanville
Rogers
Salado
Troy

Places with less than 1,000 people

Evant
Lometa
Oglesby
South Mountain

Unincorporated places

Bee House
Bend (partial)
Ding Dong
Flat
Heidenheimer
Izoro
Jonesboro (partial) 
Leon Junction
Moffat
Mound
Pendleton
Pidcoke
Prairie Dell
Purmela
White Hall

Demographics

As of the census of 2020, there were 475,367 people, 155,894 households, and 106,779 families residing within the MSA. The racial makeup of the MSA was 52.0% White (Non-Hispanic White 45.9%), 19.6% African American, 0.9% Native American, 2.7% Asian, 1.0% Pacific Islander, 8.6% from other races, and 13.9% from two or more races. Hispanic or Latino of any race were 24.0% of the population.

The median income for a household in the MSA was $36,349 and the median income for a family was $40,386. Males had a median income of $27,529 versus $21,396 for females. The per capita income for the MSA was $16,271.

See also
List of cities in Texas
Texas census statistical areas
List of Texas metropolitan areas
Texas Triangle

References

 
Geography of Bell County, Texas
Geography of Coryell County, Texas
Geography of Lampasas County, Texas